Fort de Romainville, (in English, Fort Romainville) was built in France in the 1830s and was used as a Nazi concentration camp in World War II.

Use in World War II 
Fort de Romainville was a Nazi prison and transit camp, located in the outskirts of Paris. The Fort was taken in 1940 by the German military and transformed into a prison. From there, resistants and hostages were directed to the Nazi concentration camps. People were interned there before being deported to Auschwitz, Ravensbrück, Buchenwald or Dachau concentration camps; the deportees comprised 3,900 women and 3,100 men.

In the Fort itself, 152 persons were executed by firing squad. A few escaped, such as Pierre Georges, alias "Colonel Fabien." From her cell, Danielle Casanova motivated and encouraged her comrades to confront their torturers. From February 1944, the Fort held primarily female prisoners (resistants and hostages), who were jailed, executed or redirected to the camps. At liberation in August 1944, many abandoned corpses were found in the Fort's yard.

Gallery

References

See also 

 Vichy France
 Military history of France during World War II
 World War II
 Jews outside Europe under Nazi occupation
 Eddie Chapman aka Agent Zigzag
 Anthony Faramus
 Liberation of Paris
 Concentration camps in France
 Italian concentration camps
 Nazi concentration camps
 Nazi concentration camp list
 Concentration and internment camps list
 The Holocaust

World War II internment camps in France
Nazi concentration camps in France
Fortifications of Paris
1830s establishments in France